The 2016–17 Liga Națională was the 59th season of Romanian Handball League, the top-level men's professional handball league. The league comprises fourteen teams. Dinamo București were the defending champions.

Teams

League table

Standings

Play-Off

Knockout phase

League table – positions 1–4

League table – positions 5–8

Play-Out

Season statistics

Number of teams by counties

Top goalscorers
As of 30 November 2016:

References

External links
 Romanian Handball Federaration 

Liga Națională (men's handball)
2016 in Romanian sport
2017 in Romanian sport
2016–17 domestic handball leagues